Chekan (also Romanized as Chekān and Chakān; also known as Chagān, Chikian, and Chikyan) is a village in Sarajuy-ye Shomali Rural District, in the Central District of Maragheh County, East Azerbaijan Province, Iran. At the 2006 census, its population was 966, in 231 families.

References 

Towns and villages in Maragheh County